Lambertus Johannes Folkert "Bert" Broer (17 January 1916 – 1991) was a Dutch physicist and mathematician.

References

External links 
Prof. dr. L.J.F. Broer, 1916 - 1991 at the University of Amsterdam Album Academicum website
 

1916 births
1991 deaths
20th-century Dutch mathematicians
20th-century Dutch physicists
University of Amsterdam alumni
Academic staff of the Eindhoven University of Technology
People from Dordrecht